The judicial police, judiciary police, or justice police are (depending on both country and legal system) either a branch, separate police agency or type of duty performed by law enforcement structures in a country. The term judiciary police is mostly a functional title, a role which is assumed by elements of the larger police force who act under direct guidance of the prosecutor. They exist primarily to provide evidence to the prosecutor. They can arrest and interrogate suspects, conduct lineups, question witnesses, and even interrogate non-suspects.

Types
In civil law systems, it is common for judiciary police to be a separate police structure from internal affairs police structure, but they can overlap in duties and competencies.

The most important difference is that the judiciary police typically report to the judicial branch of government or to the justice ministry or department of the executive branch, and "normal" police, such as the  gendarmerie, typically report to the ministry of internal affairs of the executive branch. Typical duties performed by the judicial police are administering and securing administration offices of the judicial branch, courts and prisons, providing physical security to judicial officials such as judges, criminal investigators and prosecutors, transportation of defendants and prisoners between courts, jails and law enforcement offices and other duties linked to enforcement of criminal law.

In some cases, the judicial police secure enforcement of non-criminal judicial decisions, such as providing physical security to judicial enforcement officers (ushers or bailiffs), but that is commonly the duty of normal police. It is common for criminal investigation duties, usually under the direction of a prosecutor's office, to be performed by the judicial police branch instead of a criminal investigation department within a standard police force, but it does not commonly participate in other forms of law enforcement, such as enforcement of traffic codes.

Civil law judiciary police are, thus, in many ways similar to the institutes of sheriff or marshall in common law countries.

By country

France 

Judicial police are a functional type of police in France that is responsible for the investigation, prosecution, and punishment of criminal offenses.

See also 
 Polícia Judiciária, the main criminal investigation police branch in Portugal
 Federal Judicial Police, former federal police force of Mexico
 Central Directorate of the Judicial Police, France
 Police and Judicial Co-operation in Criminal Matters
 Central Directorate of the Judicial Police and Intelligence
 Judicial officer

References 

Judiciaries
Law enforcement